Anton Prakapenia (born 26 September 1988) is a Belarusian handball player. He plays for HSC 2000 Coburg and the Belarusian national team.

He competed at the 2016 European Men's Handball Championship.

References

External links 
 

1988 births
Living people
Belarusian male handball players
Sportspeople from Gomel
Expatriate handball players
Belarusian expatriate sportspeople in Austria